Agencia Venezolana de Noticias (AVN) is the national news agency of Venezuela. It is part of the Ministry of Popular Power for Communication and Information (MINCI), but is run as an autonomous service. It reports on national and regional issues, as well as on Latin America in general.

History
AVN was re-founded in 2005 by the Ministry of Communication and Information (MCI) as the Agencia Bolivariana de Noticias (ABN). Its predecessor was the news agency Venpres, which had been founded on 23 May 1977. 

In October 2008, Venezuelan minister Andrés Izarra declared in an interview at Radio Nacional de Venezuela that the ABN would be converted into a state owned corporation under the name Agencia Venezolana de Noticias.  He stated this was the result of an investigation about the working conditions, and that rebranding the agency should increase the chances of ABN employees on the job market. On 20 June 2010, ABN renaming was formally announced as AVN.

See also
 List of newspapers in Venezuela

References

News agencies based in Venezuela
Bolivarian Communication and Information System
Organizations established in 1977
1977 establishments in Venezuela